Hochwurzen is a ski area located in Austria. It is part of the Schladminger 4-Berge-Schaukel, which are four interconnected mountains.

Ski areas and resorts in Austria
Tourist attractions in Styria
Schladming Tauern